Fode is a surname and given name. Notable people with this name include:

 Fode, a Star Wars Resistance character
 Fode Cisse, Guinean politician
 Fode Dabo, Sierra Leonean diplomat
 Fode Mamadou Touré (1910–1992), Guinean politician
 Fodé Ballo-Touré (born 1997), football player
 Fodé Bangaly Diakité (born 1985), Ivorian football player
 Fodé Bangoura, Guinean politician
 Fodé Bouya Camara (born 1946), Guinean football player
 Fodé Camara (born 1973), Guinean football player
 Fodé Camara (footballer, born 1973) (born 1973), Guinean football player
 Fodé Camara (footballer, born 1988) (born 1988), Guinean football player
 Fodé Camara (footballer, born 1998) (born 1998), Guinean football player
 Fodé Doucouré (born 2001), Malian football player
 Fodé Fofana (born 2002), Dutch football player
 Fodé Mansaré (born 1981), Guinean football player
 Fodé Moussa Sylla (born 1988), Guinean football player
 Fodé Seck, Senegalese diplomat
 Fodé Soumah, Guinean politician
 Fodé Sylla (born 1963), French politician
 Gordon Fode (born 1971), Australian football player
 Henning Fode (born 1948), Danish civil servant
 Pierson Fodé (born 1991), American celebrity
 Yaguine Koita and Fodé Tounkara (born 1985)